This list of mines in Portugal is subsidiary to the list of mines article and lists working, defunct and future mines in the country and is organised by the primary mineral output. For practical purposes stone, marble and other quarries may be included in this list.

Coal
Camadas de Guimarota
Cloete

Copper
Neves-Corvo mine
Sao Domingos Mine

Gold
Sao Domingos Mine

Lead
Aljustrel mine

Pyrite
Lousal mine
Sao Domingos Mine

Silver
Sao Domingos Mine

Tungsten
Panasqueira
Tabuaço mine

Zinc
Aljustrel mine
Neves-Corvo mine

References 

Portugal